Princess and the Pony (also known as 1st Furry Valentine) is a 2011 drama film by The Asylum.

Plot 
In order to protect her identity, young Princess Evelyn (Fiona Perry) is sent to live with distant relatives in America. She initially has difficulty adjusting to life in the town until she befriends a pony held captive by a shady carnival owner.

Cast
Fiona Perry as Princess Evelyn Cottington
Bill Oberst Jr. as Theodore Snyder
Bobbi Jo Lathan as Aunt Fay
Ron Hajak as Lawrence
Aubrey Wakeling as Fernando
Alison Lees-Taylor as Velora
Jonathan Nation as Sheriff Bartelbaum
Olivia Stuck as Becky
Kim Little as Queen Matilda
Brian Ibsen as Roberts
Michael William Arnold as Timmy
Twinkie as Echo the Pony

Reception
Common Sense Media gave the film one star and criticized it for having "a shocking amount of violence for a movie billed as "family entertainment."" In contrast, the Dove Foundation rated the film favorably and stated it was an "entertaining movie for the entire family" and gave it the Dove "Family-Approved" seal.

References

External links
 Princess and the Pony at The Asylum
 
 

2011 direct-to-video films
2011 drama films
2011 independent films
2011 films
American drama films
The Asylum films
Films about horses
Films set in the United States
Films shot in Los Angeles
Films directed by Rachel Lee Goldenberg
2010s English-language films
2010s American films